Irina Guseinovna Afanasieva (born 12 September 1968) is a Russian theatre producer, librettist, director, and head of the Leningrad Youth Palace (LDM) Theatre ‘New Stage’.

Career
From 1998 to 2012, she worked as the director general of the Russian-American company Hollywood Nights.

In September 2013, she established the producer centre ‘Makers Lab’. In 2014, she staged her first musical ‘The Master and Margarita’ at the St. Petersburg Music Hall. Later on, she annually participated in the productions of musicals: ‘Onegin’s Demon’ (2015), ‘Chudo-Yudo’ (2016), ‘Oscar and the Lady in Pink. Letters to God’ (2017), ‘Lolita’ (2018), ‘Seven Novellas’ (2019), ‘Diamond Chariot’ (2020), ‘The Curious Case of Benjamin Button’ (2021).

In February 2017, at the initiative of Afanasieva, the reconstruction of the Leningrad Youth Palace began where in October a new theatre was opened under the name of ‘Theatre LDM. New stage‘, which she headed.

Theatrical works
Theatre LDM ‘New Stage’
 2014 — ‘The Master and Margarita’ — producer, director, librettist
 2015 — ‘Onegin’s Demon’ — producer, director, librettist
 2016 — ‘Chudo-Yudo’— producer, director, librettist
 2017 — ‘Oscar and the Lady in Pink. Letters to God’— producer, director, librettist
 2018 — ‘Lolita’— producer, director, librettist
 2019 — ‘Seven Novellas’ — producer, director, librettist
 2020 — ‘Diamond Chariot’ — producer, director, librettist
 2021 — ‘The Curious Case of Benjamin Button’ — producer, director, librettist

References

Russian theatre managers and producers
Russian librettists
Russian directors
1968 births
Living people